Antichrist characters have been the continuing subject of speculation and attraction, often explored in fiction and media, and the character has developed its own fictional mythology apart from biblical scripture. For example, the Book of Revelation does not say the Antichrist will be the son of Satan (it does not even mention him), but the idea was made popular in at least two movies, The Omen, and its sequels, with the evil child, Damien, who grows up with the destiny to rule and destroy the world, and Rosemary's Baby with her son, Adrian.

In fact, the five uses of the term "antichrist" or "antichrists" in the Johannine epistles do not clearly present a single latter-day individual Antichrist. The articles "the deceiver" or "the antichrist" are usually seen as marking out a certain category of persons, rather than an individual.

Consequently, attention for an individual Antichrist figure focuses on the second chapter of 2 Thessalonians. However, the term "antichrist" is never used in this passage:

Although the word "antichrist" (Greek antikhristos) is used only in the Epistles of John, the similar word "pseudochrist" (Greek pseudokhristos, meaning "false messiah") is used by Jesus in the Gospels:

Portrayals 

Antichrist characters portrayed in fiction and nonfiction include:

A nameless leader that assumes the reinstituted office of Roman Emperor, in The Tale of Anti-Christ by Vladimir Solovyov
Jake Gray in Devour
Jesse, a human/demon hybrid in the Supernatural episode I Believe the Children Are Our Future, is confirmed as the Antichrist by the angel Castiel. Unlike most personifications of the Antichrist, Jesse is neutrally aligned, able to be deterred from his "destined" path when Sam Winchester tells him the whole truth about his origins and capabilities.
The talking ape Shift in C. S. Lewis' The Last Battle.
Stone Alexander (played by Michael York) in the films The Omega Code,  and Megiddo: The Omega Code 2.
Nicolae Carpathia from the Christian book series Left Behind.
Brother Bartholomew from Salem Kirban's 1970 novel, 666.
Damian from the Flash game series Quickdraw.
Damien Thorn from The Omen series. This movie was influential in that, in many of the "Anti-Christian" movies that followed, it was naturally assumed that the Antichrist would be Satan's "begotten" son.
Angel Caine, played by Simon Ward, in the film Holocaust 2000 (aka The Chosen).
The animal Antichrist in the South Park episode "Woodland Critter Christmas", though at the end of this episode it is revealed that he was only part of a story made up by Cartman
The 'Damien' Antichrist from the South Park episode "Damien"
Adolf Hitler, in Robert Van Kampen's novel The Fourth Reich. Hitler's spirit is released from Hell and enters an embryo created from his cloned DNA. He is then born in Russia and grows up to become that country's dictator, eventually revealing his true identity to the world before the UN General Assembly. Van Kampen also stated that Hitler "best meets all requirements to be the Antichrist" in his former book, The Sign.
Randall Flagg from The Stand by Stephen King
Joey Atkins from Strange. He is the son of the demon Azal and is destined to take on his father's role.
'Pepito' from Squee!
Adrian, from the film Little Nicky. 
Quinn Dexter from Peter F. Hamilton's The Night's Dawn Trilogy. He is an avowed Satanist who tries to bring God's Brother (Satan) into the world to destroy all life in the universe. 
The demon Agares, from The Day After Judgement by James Blish
Julian Felsenburgh in Lord of the World by Robert Hugh Benson
The European President in Father Elijah: An Apocalypse by Michael D. O'Brien
Adam Young from Neil Gaiman and Terry Pratchett's novel Good Omens
Christina in the TV series Point Pleasant
Franco Macaluso from various Cloud Ten Pictures movies
The titular character (occasionally referred to as Adam Kadmon) of the Marilyn Manson album Antichrist Superstar
Santa Clause from Santa's Slay, he is the polar opposite to Jesus in that he is the son of Satan instead of God's son
Danny Wormwood from Chronicles of Wormwood
Christopher Goodman from the Christ Clone Trilogy by James BeauSeigneur
Lucy, from Lucy, the Daughter of the Devil
The Priest's assistant in "The Serpentine Offering" video clip from the album In Sorte Diaboli by Dimmu Borgir
The United States President in Pat Robertson's book The End of the Age Took power by following the suicide of one president and arranging the murder of his immediate predecessor as well as the murder of the president's killer.
Iscarius Alchemy, a resurrected Judas Iscariot in Matthew Dickens' Shekinah Chronicles series, published by Destiny Image.
Azul Dante in the Prodigal Project book series written by Ken Abrham and Daniel Hart.
Baal in the novel Baal by Robert R. McCammon
Immanuel Bernstate in Jonathan R. Cash's novel The Age of the Antichrist.
Sir Richard Grant Morrison in the novel We All Fall Down by Brian Caldwell
Chaos, the King of the Old Ones.
Adrian from the film Rosemary's Baby.
Slum King from Violence Jack, a demonic undead samurai created by Ryo Asuka/Satan to punish himself for the murder of Devilman. The Slum King serves as the ultimate antagonist for Violence Jack.
Fuma Monou from Clamp's X
Johan Liebert from Naoki Urasawa's Monster
Griffith (Berserk) from Kentaro Miura's Berserk
Set Abominae from the Something Wicked Saga
Woland from Mihail Bulgakov's The Master and Margarita
Mason Wolfe in the novel The Last Fisherman by Randy England
In the Apocalypse Chronicles trilogy, Lucien St. Clair is raised from the dead and goes on to rule the world as the Antichrist under the name of Lucius Devoran, a name deliberately chosen for its Latin numerical value of 666.
Daniel Quinn in his book The Story of B
Emmanuel Lewis is described as the Antichrist in the 1996 Bloodhound Gang song "Fire Water Burn", and it is presumed he will keep the singer company in Hell, along with several dead celebrities.
Laura Goodman in the Undead series by MaryJanice Davidson
In Gore Vidal's 1954 dystopian novel Messiah a new death-worshipping religion sweeps the world, completely displacing and destroying Christianity. After their victory, the new religion's adherents declare their Prophet to have been the Antichrist, meaning that as praise.
 Michael Langdon from American Horror Story (season 1 Murder House and season 8 Apocalypse); he is the result of Tate Langdon raping Vivien Harmon as a ghost, when she was still a human, and is therefore believed to be the antichrist.
 The seventeenth-century painter Christoph Haizmann is depicted as Antichrist in the 2003 horror mocumentary Searching for Haizmann by Scott Gordon & Ron Meyer
Harry Potter in Alan Moore's The League of Extraordinary Gentlemen, Volume III: Century. In this universe he is brought about by the Invisible College, a cult of magicians led by Oliver Haddo, as the moonchild destined to bring the apocalypse. All his exploits were in fact orchestrated by the College (Haddo acting as Lord Voldemort).
The Swedish band Ghost makes portrayals of the birth of the Antichrist and then the life of him following on their two full-length albums.
Malachi in the 2005 UK Hex TV series
Anung Un Rama, also known as Hellboy, is a popular comic book and motion picture protagonist who is also the son of the Devil. Despite being destined as an Antichrist figure, being given an oversized right hand of stone which is to act as the key to unleash great evil upon the world, Hellboy has foresworn this burden and instead fights to protect the world from evil and darkness.
Earl Grundy in Rapture-Palooza
Madison Dellamea as Amy Calder from The Messengers
Guy Fieri in  Homestuck. In the alternate-reality Earth seen in the comic's sixth act, Fieri becomes known as the "third and final antichrist" after he joins the Supreme Court of the United States and assists the Insane Clown Posse, the Dual Presidents of the United States, in exterminating humanity for the alien Condesce.
Lucius Wagner in the "Lucius" videogame series.
Angel Caine in the 1977 movie Holocaust 2000.
Anghela Sta. Ana or "NgaHela" in 2016 Filipino horror movie Seklusyon, played by child actress Rhed Bustamante, she is known to execute or exhibit healing powers which heals the sick, heal the wounded and turn the rotten bread into new one with an unknown black liquid coming out on her mouth, though innocent, childly, virgin and poor looking girl at first, some priests, friars and deacons questioned her ability as they continue to investigate, her true power is soon revealed that it did not came from God, but from The Devil and her true purpose and nature was to use every past sin of young priests inside the convent so that to lure them into a trap and to make them praise her as a deity and enslave every human faith, but it soon backfired to her as one of the priest tries to stop her schemes. She is killed by a young priest by stabbing her multiple times so that her influence would not spread.
 Charlie from Hazbin Hotel is the daughter of Lucifer and Lilith and the princess of Hell.
Aion in Chrono Crusade anime.
Sabrina Spellman in the Netflix series Chilling Adventures of Sabrina is the daughter of Lucifer and is prophesied to bring about the apocalypse by performing satanic perversions of the miracles Jesus performed
Lucas from Little Evil who is the son of Samantha and step-son of Gary Bloom who is born on 6 June, a Satanist group plans to sacrifice him on his 6th birthday to open the gates of hell so the devil can possess him to commence the end of the world.
Ricardo Montana from the Brazilian telenovela Apocalipse produced by Casablanca and Record TV, based on the Book of Revelation. Ricardo is played by Brazilian actor Sérgio Marone.
Judas Iscariot (The Man from Kerioth) in The Angelic Human series by JD McCroskey.
 Bishop Uriah Leonard/Pope Sixtus VI in The Seven Last Years (1978) by Carol Balizet  
Antiochus IV Epiphanes (resurrected by Satan) in Titan, Son of Saturn (1905) by Joseph Birbeck Burroughs 
Jacque Catroux in Beast (1985) by Dan Betzer -

References 

 
Antichrists